Ennea is a genus of air-breathing land snails, terrestrial pulmonate gastropod mollusks in the family Streptaxidae.

Ennea is the type genus of the subfamily Enneinae.

Distribution 
The distribution of the genus Ennea is Afrotropical and includes:

Species
Species within the genus Ennea include:
 Ennea arthuri Preston, 1913 (taxon inquirendum)
 Ennea cylindracea E.A. Smith, 1897 (taxon inquirendum)
Species brought into synonymy:
 Ennea aliena Bavay & Dautzenberg, 1912: synonym of Indoennea aliena (Bavay & Dautzenberg, 1912) accepted as Sinoennea aliena (Bavay & Dautzenberg, 1912) (original combination)

References

 Bank, R. (2017). Classification of the Recent terrestrial Gastropoda of the World. Last update: July 16th, 2017

External links 
 Dohrn H. (1865). "List of the land and freshwater shells of the Zambezi and Lake Nyasa, eastern tropical Africa, collected by John Kirk". Proceedings of the Zoological Society of London 1865: 231-234. page 233.
 Preston H. B. (1914). "Characters of three new species of Ennea from southern Nigeria". Proceedings of the Malacological Society, London 11: 134-136.

Streptaxidae